The Inabaknon language, also known as Abaknon, Abaknon Sama, Capuleño, Kapul, or Capul Sinama, is an Austronesian language primarily spoken in the Island Municipality of Capul of Northern Samar, in the Eastern Visayas Region of the Philippines.

Unlike the other indigenous languages of the Eastern Visayas, namely Waray, Cebuano and Boholano, Inabaknon is not classified as part of the Visayan language family, but is rather grouped with the Sama–Bajaw languages.

Background
Inabaknon is spoken on the island of Capul in the province of Northern Samar. According to oral folk history, due to their not liking of the religion of the Moros who ruled over them, a group of people and their leader Abak fled Balabac and sailed until reaching the island. The language is notable as being the only Sama language to not have had major Arabic influence via Islam.

References

Citations

Sources

External links
 Literature and articles in Literature and articles in Abaknon.

Sama–Bajaw languages
Languages of Northern Samar